Jeanne Leblanc (born September 27, 1978) is a Canadian film director and screenwriter from Quebec, whose full-length directoral debut Isla Blanca was released in 2018.

Career 
She previously directed the short films Sortie de secours (2002), Le temps des récoltes (2009), One Night with You [Une nuit avec toi] (2011), Sullivan's Applicant (2012) and Carla en 10 secondes (2016).

Her second feature film, Our Own (Les Nôtres), premiered at the Rendez-vous Québec Cinéma in 2020.

In 2021 she was the patron and curator of the Festival Vues dans la tête de... film festival in Rivière-du-Loup.

References

External links

21st-century Canadian screenwriters
21st-century Canadian women writers
Canadian women film directors
Canadian women screenwriters
Canadian screenwriters in French
Film directors from Quebec
French Quebecers
People from Lanaudière
Writers from Quebec
Living people
1978 births
Université du Québec à Montréal alumni